The Women's points race at the 2013 UCI Track Cycling World Championships was held on February 23. 17 athletes participated in the contest. The competition consisted of 100 laps, making a total of 25 km with 10 sprints.

Medalists

Results
The race was held at 19:25.

References

2013 UCI Track Cycling World Championships
UCI Track Cycling World Championships – Women's points race
UCI